Eleonora d'Este (2 January 1643, Mantua – 24 February 1722, Modena) was an Italian Discalced Carmelite princess and nun.

Biography
She was the daughter of Francesco I d'Este, Duke of Modena and his first wife Maria Farnese – the couple had had another child called Eleonora in 1639 but she had died aged one.

She grew up in her father's court and became known at a very early age for her religious fervour and works of charity. On 3 May 1674 she entered a Discalced Carmelite convent, changing her name to Maria Francesca dello Spirito Santo. She was frequently put in charge of the religious community and was also entrusted with setting up a monastery in Reggio Emilia, which opened in 1689 and remained open until 1798. She became so popular that she also became a spiritual director to several noblewomen. She died in 1722 with the odour of sanctity and her remains are still venerated by the Catholic church.

References

17th-century Italian Roman Catholic religious sisters and nuns
Discalced Carmelites
Venerated Carmelites
Eleonora
1643 births
1722 deaths
18th-century Italian Roman Catholic religious sisters and nuns
Daughters of monarchs